
In basketball, a steal is the act of legally gaining possession of the ball by a defensive player who causes the opponent to turn the ball over. The top 25 highest steals totals in National Collegiate Athletic Association (NCAA) Division I women's basketball history are listed below. While the NCAA's current three-division format has been in place since the 1973–74 season, the organization did not sponsor women's sports until the 1981–82 school year; before that time, women's college sports were governed by the Association of Intercollegiate Athletics for Women (AIAW). Steals are a relatively new statistic in college basketball, having only become an official statistic in NCAA women's basketball beginning with the 1987–88 season.

Key

Top 25 career steals leaders

Footnotes

References
General
 

Specific

NCAA Division I women's basketball statistical leaders
Lists of women's basketball players in the United States